Petar Trendafilov (born 11 September 1984) is a former professional Bulgarian tennis player. On 10 February 2014, he reached his highest ATP singles ranking of 825 whilst his best doubles ranking was 660 on 3 November 2014.

Year-end rankings

Challenger and Futures Finals

Singles: 1 (0–1)

Doubles: 7 (2–5)

Davis Cup 
Petar Trendafilov debuted for the Bulgaria Davis Cup team in 2012. Since then he has 1 nomination with 3 ties played, his singles W/L record is 0–0 and doubles W/L record is 3–0 (3–0 overall).

Doubles (3–0) 

 PPO = Promotion Play–off
 RR = Round Robin

References

External links

 
 
 

Bulgarian male tennis players
1984 births
Living people
People from Dimitrovgrad, Bulgaria
Sportspeople from Haskovo Province
21st-century Bulgarian people